Maurice J. McCarthy was an American football player and coach.  He was the head football coach at Fordham University in 1900 and co-head coach in 1901 with Fred L. Smith. He compiled an overall record of 5–2–2.

Head coaching record

References

Year of birth missing
Year of death missing
Fordham Rams football coaches
Fordham Rams football players